Kalmar BTK is a table tennis club in Kalmar, Sweden. Established on 14 June 1960, the club won the Swedish national men's team championship in 1996, 1999, 2000 and 2002. Jan-Ove Waldner played for the club between 1996 and 2006.

References

External links
Official website 

1960 establishments in Sweden
Sport in Kalmar
Sports clubs established in 1960
Table tennis clubs in Sweden